XHANS-FM is a radio station on 92.5 FM in Bahía Asunción, Baja California Sur.

History
XHANS received its concession on February 26, 1996.

References

Radio stations in Baja California Sur
Radio stations established in 1996